The death of a popular musician, and likewise, the use of a dead musician's work in advertising, often causes a sharp increase in sales of the musician's recordings and associated products; this has led to a number of posthumous number one singles in the UK and elsewhere.  
The phenomenon, a topic of discussion in both the media and academia, has occurred 20 times in the UK since 1959.

The UK Singles Chart is a record chart compiled on behalf of the British record industry based on sales of singles in the UK. Since 1997, the chart has been compiled by The Official Charts Company and was based entirely on sales of physical singles from retail outlets until 2006, when digital downloads were included in the chart compilation. The UK Singles Chart originated in 1952, when New Musical Express (NME) published the first chart of singles sales.  The first deceased artist to top the charts was Buddy Holly, who died in a plane crash on 3 February 1959.  Three weeks later his song "It Doesn't Matter Anymore" entered the charts, and in April it reached number one.  In the 1960s Eddie Cochran and Jim Reeves achieved their first and only UK number ones after their deaths, as did Jimi Hendrix in 1970.

In  August 1977 the "King of Rock'n Roll", Elvis Presley, died of a heart attack and his song "Way Down", which was already in the charts at the time, quickly climbed to number one.  Presley achieved four further posthumous number ones in the 2000s.  In 2002 his song "A Little Less Conversation", a little-known former B-side, topped the charts after being remixed by Dutch dance music producer Junkie XL for a television advertisement for Nike, which broke Presley's long-standing tie with The Beatles for the most UK number ones.  Three years later three of his singles returned to the top spot when all his previous number one singles were re-issued to mark what would have been his 70th birthday.

In late 1980 and early 1981 three singles by John Lennon reached number one in quick succession following his murder on 8 December 1980.  His fellow former member of The Beatles, George Harrison, achieved a posthumous number one in 2002 when a re-issue of his song "My Sweet Lord", originally a number one in 1971, entered the chart at number one.  In doing so, he knocked "More than a Woman" by American singer Aaliyah from the top spot, the first time that two deceased artists had topped the charts in consecutive weeks.

Number ones

The following singles were all explicitly credited (either wholly or partially) to deceased artists when they reached number one on the UK Singles Chart. Singles featuring deceased artists who did not receive an explicit credit (e.g. as a member of a band), such as the 1991 re-release of Queen's "Bohemian Rhapsody" following the death of lead singer Freddie Mercury and the 2021 chart performance of Wham!'s "Last Christmas" just over four years after George Michael's death, are not included.

See also
 List of posthumous number ones on the UK Albums Chart

Notes

References
General

Specific

Posthumous
Cultural aspects of death